Rúbaň is a village and municipality in the Nové Zámky District in the Nitra Region of south-west Slovakia.

History
In historical records the village was first mentioned in 1268.

Geography
The municipality lies at an altitude of 134 metres and covers an area of 16.109 km². It has a population of about 1000 people.

Ethnicity
The population is about 86% Hungarian and 14% Slovak.

Facilities
The village has a small public library and a football pitch.

References

External links
 Rúbaň – Nové Zámky Okolie

Villages and municipalities in Nové Zámky District